The Troyanovo-1 coal mine is a large coal mine located in Burgas Province. Troyanovo-1 represents one of the largest coal reserve in Bulgaria having estimated reserves of 525.3 million tonnes of coal and an annual coal production of around 8 million tonnes.

References 

Coal mines in Bulgaria